20 is an album by American singer and pianist Harry Connick Jr. It was recorded when Connick was 20 years old, and released in 1988. It is his second album from Columbia Records, but his first album with vocal (on 6 of 11 tracks), from the label. As with the eponymous album that preceded it, Connick dedicated 20 "to the memory of my loving mother, Anita Connick."

Track listing

Musicians 
 Harry Connick Jr. – Vocals (track #3 "Imagination", #4 "Do You Know What It Means to Miss New Orleans", #5 "Basin Street Blues", #7 "Please Don't Talk About Me When I'm Gone", #10 "If I Only Had a Brain", #11 "Do Nothin' till You Hear from Me"), piano
 Carmen McRae – Vocals on track #7 "Please Don't Talk About Me When I'm Gone"
 Dr. John – Organ, vocals on track #4 "Do You Know What It Means to Miss New Orleans"
 Robert Leslie Hurst III – Bass on track #11 "Do Nothin' till You Hear from Me"

Charts 
 1989 Top Jazz Albums # 6 
 1991 The Billboard 200 # 133

Certification

References

External links 
 When Harry Met Stardom Bill Beuttler (American Way, August 1, 1990)

1988 albums
Harry Connick Jr. albums
Columbia Records albums
Albums produced by George Butler (record producer)